Kent House or variations including Kent Barn may refer to:

In Canada
Kent Cottage, also called Landfall or Freshwater, a historic dwelling in Brigus, Newfoundland

In the United Kingdom
Kent House railway station, railway station in Beckenham, south east London
The London Studios, also called Kent House, a television studio complex owned by ITV plc
Kent House, Hammersmith, a building in Hammersmith, London
Kent House on the Isle of Wight

In the United States

Jerry Kent House, Yuma, Arizona, listed on the NRHP in Yuma County
Sydney Kent House, Chicago, Illinois, NRHP-listed in Cook County
Kent House and Hitchens House, Williamsport, Indiana, listed on the NRHP in Warren County
Kent Plantation House, in Alexandria, Louisiana, listed on the NRHP in Rapides Parish
Charles Adolph Kent Sr. House, Kentwood, Louisiana, listed on the NRHP in Tangipahoa Parish
Jonas Cutting-Edward Kent House, Bangor, Maine, listed on the NRHP in Penobscot County 
Rockwell Kent Cottage and Studio, Monhegen Plantation, Maine, listed on the NRHP in Lincoln County
Reid-Kent House, Kalispell, Montana, listed on the NRHP in Flathead County
Kent Dairy Round Barn, Red Lodge, Montana, NRHP-listed in Carbon County
Moses-Kent House, Exeter, New Hampshire, NRHP-listed in Rockingham County
Moses Kent House, Lyme, New Hampshire, NRHP-listed in Grafton County
Kent-Delord House, Plattsburgh, New York, NRHP-listed in Clinton County
Zeno Kent House, Aurora, Ohio, listed on the NRHP in Portage County
J. Kent Residence, Bath, Ohio, NRHP-listed in Summit County
Charles Kent House, Kent, Ohio, NRHP-listed in Portage County
Thomas Kent Jr. Farm, Waynersburg, Pennsylvania, NRHP-listed in Greene County
Kent-Valentine House, Richmond, Virginia, NRHP-listed
Boynton-Kent House, Lufkin, Texas, listed on the NRHP in Angelina County

In fiction
The home of Jonathan and Martha Kent, fictional foster parents of Clark Kent/Superman